Thomas Bradford "Brad" Xavier (born February 21, 1965), known by his stage name Daddy X, is an American hip hop producer and rapper. He used to be in the punk/hardcore band Doggy Style and the hip hop group Kottonmouth Kings in which he went by the stage name of Daddy X. He was the frontman for Kottonmouth Kings, Humble Gods, Doggy Style, Double Freak and X-Pistols (with The Dirtball). He has a daughter named Sky Blue Xavier, and wrote a song for her on his debut solo album Organic Soul.

Discography

LPs

Singles

Videography

References

External links 
 Kottonmouth Kings Official Site
 Kottonmouth Kings' Official Website Biography on Brad "Daddy" X
 Daddy X Official Myspace

Suburban Noize Records artists
Rap rock musicians
1965 births
Living people
Underground rappers
West Coast hip hop musicians
Rappers from California
21st-century American rappers